The kitchen work triangle is a concept used to determine efficient kitchen layouts that are both aesthetically pleasing and functional.  The primary tasks in a home kitchen are carried out between the cook top, the sink and the refrigerator. These three points and the imaginary lines between them make up what kitchen experts call the work triangle.  The idea is that when these three elements are close (but not too close) to one another, the kitchen will be easy and efficient to use, cutting down on wasted steps.

There are exceptions to this rule. In single wall kitchens, it's geometrically impossible to achieve a true triangle, but efficiency can still be achieved through the configuration of the three items, and how far apart they are.

History 

Work on optimizing kitchen layouts was begun in the 1920s by Lillian Moller Gilbreth, an industrial psychologist and engineer, in partnership with the Brooklyn Borough Gas Company.  Gilbreth's Kitchen Practical was unveiled in 1929 at a Women's Exposition based on Gilbreth's research on motion savings.  Gilbreth referred to the L-shaped layout as "circular routing" which later came to be called the kitchen work triangle.  A specific model was developed in the 1940s to address the efficiency of the kitchen space between the major work centers:  Cooking (range), Preparation (sink/dishwasher) and Food Storage (refrigerator).  It was designed to maximize the efficiency of a one-cook kitchen that stemmed from Taylorist principles that had to do with time-motion studies from around the turn of the century.  The University of Illinois School of Architecture developed the work triangle to emphasize cost reduction by standardizing construction.  This resulted in a variety of configurations.

Application 

The kitchen work triangle principle is used by kitchen designers and architects when designing residential kitchens. Recommended dimensions and layouts will vary with different building codes around the world, but some examples are:

 If possible, there should be no major traffic flow through the triangle.
 A full-height obstacle, such as a tall cabinet, should not come between any two points of the triangle.

Besides the work triangle itself, there are several rules of thumb to consider when planning a kitchen:

 A sink should have a clear counter area of at least  on one side, and at least  on the other side.
 A stove or cooktop should have a clear  area on one side, and at least  on the other side.
 At least  of food preparation area should be located next to the sink.
 In a seating area where no traffic passes behind the diner, allow  from the wall to the edge of the table or counter; if traffic passes behind the diner, allow .

Kitchen zones

Quite a few things have changed since the 1940s when the concept originated. After the Second World War, typically it was the housewife who cooked, cleaned, ironed, and served the family meals; kitchen sizes were generally smaller than today. The kitchen was considered a working area, and planning considered mostly utilitarian angles.

The original functions described with the kitchen triangle still exist within the modern-day kitchen.  However, technologies (like microwaves and other appliances) and the way kitchens fit into the modern (Western) lifestyle have changed. Many kitchens have grown to accommodate more than one cook, so cooking zones were developed that are similar to the layout and zoning of commercial kitchens. With the housing boom and the expanding wealth of the Baby Boomers, the size of kitchens in the United States has expanded.

This allows for commercial style appliances, and zones for various functions that were outside of the traditional triangle, such as prep stations that might include another smaller sink, and bake centers that had areas specifically for rolling out dough and baking that were separate from the main cooking appliances and food prep areas.  These additional zones might overlap in terms of sharing components and create secondary triangles.

In the early '90s, the National Kitchen & Bath Association introduced the multiple rectangle concept - the idea being where the microwave or separate ovens were considered a fourth or fifth element, taking into account families who didn't always eat together and the assumption that there might be multiple cooks. It never caught on - partly because of insufficient PR and partly due to too much flexibility in deciding what the four corners of the rectangle actually were.

A later concept is that of kitchen zones. In this layout, the proportions of the triangle are no more an ergonomic requirement. There are usually four zones present: food preparation, baking, cooking, and cleaning.

References

External links 

 
 Gilbreth, Jr., Frank B., and Ernestine Gilbreth Carey. (1950) Belles on Their Toes, Chapter 10, "Efficiency Kitchen" - a lighthearted account of Lillian Gilbreth's kitchen design, by two of her twelve children.

Kitchen
Ergonomics